Mawk'allaqta or Mawk'a Llaqta (Quechua mawk'a ancient, llaqta place (village, town, city, country, nation), "ancient place", hispanicized and mixed spellings Mauka Llacta, Mauka Llaqta, Maukallaqta) is an archaeological site in Peru. It is located in the Cusco Region, Paruro Province, Paccaritambo District, near Mullipampa (Mollebamba).

References 

Archaeological sites in Peru
Archaeological sites in Cusco Region